WRJF-LP (101.7 FM, "Street Level Radio") is a radio station playing a Christian music format. Licensed to Menomonie, Wisconsin, United States, the station is currently owned by Believers City Church (Church) of Menomonie.

References

External links
WRJF-LP website
 

RJF-LP
RJF-LP